A Storm of Wings is a novel by M. John Harrison published in 1980.

Plot summary
A Storm of Wings is a novel in which an invasion of alien locusts brings a worldview incompatible with that of humanity.

Reception
Dave Langford, reviewing A Storm of Wings for White Dwarf #93, compared it to Saraband of Lost Time, stating that "Critics prefer Storm'''s literary echoes and clever bits; but for all its excessive length, more readers are likely to finish Saraband''."

Reviews
Review by Jack Rems (1980) in Locus, #234 June 1980
Review by Bob Wayne (1980) in Fantasy Newsletter, No. 27 August 1980
Review by Algis Budrys (1980) in The Magazine of Fantasy & Science Fiction, October 1980
Review by Baird Searles (1980) in Isaac Asimov's Science Fiction Magazine, December 1980
Review by Colin Greenland (1981) in Foundation, #21 February 1981
Review by David Pringle (1988) in Modern Fantasy: The Hundred Best Novels
Review [French] by Patrick Imbert (2004) in Bifrost, #34

References

1980 British novels
1980 science fiction novels
Doubleday (publisher) books